Bemani (also Romanized as Bemānī) is a village in Bemani Rural District, Byaban District, Minab County, Hormozgan Province, Iran. At the 2006 census, its population was 714, in 131 families.

References 

Populated places in Sirik County